Tyrell Corporation may refer to:

 Fictional company in the film Blade Runner that develops replicants
 The Tyrrel Corporation, a 1990s English recording group